Aquilina Celia Casañas Howell (May 3, 1917 – January 13, 2000) was the first woman to serve as Assistant Superintendent of Leon County Schools, serving from 1981 until her retirement in 1985. Howell is credited as the driving force behind the peaceful desegregation of Tallahassee's public schools, using her consensus building skills to unite disparate groups.

Early life and education
Aquilina Casañas was the eldest of four children born to Aurelio and Madeline Taylor Casañas, who resided at 442 West Georgia Street in Tallahassee, Florida. Her birth home, the Lewis and Lucretia Taylor House has been placed on the National Register of Historic Places.

She received her formal education in the public schools of Leon County, earning a BA Degree from Florida Agricultural and Mechanical University in 1938, and an MEd Degree from New York University in 1956. She completed further study at Boston University and the University of Chicago.

Casañas married Samuel Felton Howell (1909–1994) on December 20, 1941. Their children were Carmen Felton Howell Ferguson, and the late Sonya Lena Howell Bradford (died 2014).

Career
Aquilina Howell's exemplary career as a social studies, Spanish and English teacher, guidance counselor, educational supervisor and administrator spanned over forty-three years where she provided outstanding leadership and guidance to students, teachers and administrators. She settled disputes among school administrators, advised civic leaders, calmed and successfully negotiated with angry parents who did not want their children to attend a Black school, and guided the Tallahassee community through the often thorny path of school integration in the 1960s and 1970s. At her retirement, she held the distinguished honor of being the first female ever to be appointed as Assistant Superintendent in the Leon County School District.

Legacy and Honors
In appreciation for her resourcefulness in the school district and community at large, the Leon County School Board named and dedicated the Aquilina C. Howell Instructional Services Center in her honor on November 28, 1995.

Additionally Howell, along with three other devoted citizens of the Tallahassee community, was honored in the naming of the Carter-Howell-Strong Park on February 20, 1993, where she was known for her leadership, commitment and service to her birthplace, affectionately known as Frenchtown and on December 11, 2009, Aquilina Howell Street was dedicated to her memory.

Death
Howell died on January 13, 2000, at Tallahassee Memorial Healthcare after an extended illness, which began with a stroke in 1995. She was 82.

References

1917 births
2000 deaths
Florida A&M University alumni
New York University alumni
People from Tallahassee, Florida
African-American educators
20th-century African-American people